Hebei Road Subdistrict is a subdistrict and the seat of Lubei District, in the north of Tangshan, Hebei, People's Republic of China. , it has 7 residential communities under its administration.

See also
List of township-level divisions of Hebei

References

Township-level divisions of Hebei